Dichomeris contentella is a moth in the family Gelechiidae. It was described by Francis Walker in 1864. It is found on Borneo.

Adults are slaty cinereous, the forewings with two blackish discal points and a straight exterior line, as well as a fawn-coloured streak along the apical part of the costa. The marginal dots are black. The hindwings are brownish cinereous.

References

Moths described in 1864
contentella